Ardientes is the title of a studio album released by Regional Mexican band Beto y sus Canarios on July 19, 2005. This album includes its two hit singles "No Puedo Olvidarte" written by Cuauhtémoc González García and "Pensando en Ti" written by both Cuauhtémoc González García and Artemio García Palacios, then members of the group.

Track listing 
The information from Allmusic.

Chart performance

Sales and certifications

References

2005 albums
Beto y sus Canarios albums
Tierra Caliente albums